The 1952-53 French Rugby Union Championship of first division was contested by 64 clubs divided in eight pools of eight. The two better of each pool, 16 clubs, play la final phase, beginning with the "last 16".

The Championship was won by Lourdes that beat Mont-de-Marsan in the final.

Context 
The 1953 Five Nations Championship was won by Ireland, France finished fourth.

Le Challenge Yves du Manoir was won by Lourdes that defeatedla Pau in the final.

Phase de qualification 

In 'boldd the club qualified

 "Last 16" 

In bold the clubs qualified for the quarter of finals.

 Quarter of finals 

In bold''' the clubs qualified for the semifinals.

Semifinals

Final

External links
 Compte rendu finale de 1953 lnr.fr

1953
France 1953
Championship